The men's 3000 metres steeplechase event was part of the track and field athletics programme at the 1920 Summer Olympics. The competition was held on Wednesday, August 18, 1920, and on Friday, August 20, 1920. Sixteen runners from six nations competed.

Records

These were the standing world and Olympic records (in minutes) prior to the 1920 Summer Olympics.

(*) unofficial
(**) Race held over 3200 metres; equivalent time for 3000 metres is 10:08.0.

Michael Devaney won the first ever Olympic 3000 metre steeplechase race in 10:23.0. In the third heat, Percy Hodge set a new record with 10:17.4. In the final, Hodge set a new Olympic record with 10:00.4 minutes.

Results

Semifinals

Semifinal 1

Semifinal 2

Semifinal 3

Final

The final was held on Friday, August 20, 1920.

References

Sources
 
 

Steeplechase 3000 metres
Steeplechase at the Olympics